The Rușavăț is a left tributary of the river Călmățui in Romania. It flows into the Călmățui in Albești.

References

Rivers of Romania
Rivers of Buzău County